Funny Cow is a 2017 British comedy-drama film directed by Adrian Shergold and written by Tony Pitts. The film stars Maxine Peake, Paddy Considine, Tony Pitts, Stephen Graham, and Alun Armstrong. Original songs and score were composed by Richard Hawley, with additional songs by Ollie Trevers. Its plot follows a woman making a name for herself in the stand-up comedy scene of working men's clubs in northern England.

Funny Cow had its world premiere at the London Film Festival on 9 October 2017, and was released  in the United Kingdom on 20 April 2018, by eOne.

Plot
Funny Cow charts the rise to stardom of a female comedian through the 1970s and 1980s. It is set against the backdrop of working men's clubs and the stand-up comedy circuit of the north of England. Is largely based on the comedian Marti Caine and her autobiography A Coward’s Chronicles

Cast

Production
Funny Cow was shot entirely on location in January and February 2017 in Leeds, Bradford, Saltaire and Harrogate. The principal production company was POW Films. Post Production was at Lipsync Post in London and the financing production partner was Gizmo Films Productions.

Reception
Funny Cow received high praise on release with four star reviews from The Guardian, Empire, The Evening Standard, The Financial Times, The Independent, FilmSeekers, Screen Mayhem and with The Times and The Daily Star awarding a full five stars.

BFI magazine Sight and Sound listed Funny Cow as their Film Of The Week. Mark Kermode also made it his Film Of The Week  for the April 2018 theatrical release and reviewed it again for the August 2018 DVD release Noting the division in critics' perception of the film and central character, Kermode emphasised that "its heart is absolutely in the right place but I think that is because it is not ashamed to depict the world it is actually representing".

The film garnered two BIFA nominations in 2018: Best Actress for Maxine Peake and Best Music for Richard Hawley.

On the review aggregator website Rotten Tomatoes, the film holds a certified fresh rating of 79%, based on 42 reviews. The website's consensus reads, "Funny Cow rests almost entirely on Maxine Peake's performance -- which proves more than capable of shouldering the weight of this affecting period drama."

References

External links
 

2017 films
2017 comedy-drama films
British comedy-drama films
Films about comedians
Films set in Sheffield
Films directed by Adrian Shergold
2010s English-language films
2010s British films